Adultery is a form of extramarital sex.

Adultery may also refer to:
 Adultery (Do-Re-Mi album)
 Adultery (Dog Fashion Disco album)
 Adultery (1945 film), a 1945 Mexican film
 Adultery (1989 film), a 1989 South Korean film
 Adultery (novel), a 2014 novel by Paulo Coelho

See also

 

 The Adulteress (disambiguation)